Tessaoua Airport  is an airport serving Tessaoua in Niger.

References

Airports in Niger